Oflag XIII-B was a German Army World War II prisoner-of-war camp for officers (Offizierslager), originally in the Langwasser district of Nuremberg.
 
Lager Hammelburg ("Camp Hammelburg") was a large German Army training camp, opened in 1873. Part of this camp had been used as a POW camp for Allied army personnel during World War I. After 1935 it was a training camp and military training area for the newly reconstituted Army. In World War II the Army used parts of Camp Hammelburg for Oflag XIII-B. It consisted of stone buildings. Stalag XIII-C for other ranks and NCOs was located close by.

Camp history
In May 1941 part of Oflag XIII-A Langwasser, Nuremberg, was separated off, and a new camp, designated Oflag XIII-B, created for Yugoslavian officers, predominantly Serbs captured in the Balkans Campaign. In April 1943 at least 3,000 Serbian officers were moved from Langwasser to Hammelburg. Many were members of the Yugoslavian General Staff, some of whom had been POWs in Germany during the First World War.

On 11 January 1945 American officers captured during the Battle of the Bulge arrived and were placed in a separate compound. These included Lt. Lyle Bouck, Intelligence and Reconnaissance Platoon, 394th Infantry Regiment, 99th Infantry Division, and Lt. Donald Prell, Anti-tank Platoon, 422nd Infantry, 106th Division. By 25 January the total number of Americans was 453 officers, 12 non-commissioned officers and 18 privates.

On 10 March 1945 American officers, captured in the North Africa Campaign in 1943 or the Battle of Normandy, arrived after an eight-week  forced march from Oflag 64 in Szubin, Poland. On 25 March there was a total of 1,291 American officers and 127 enlisted men at the camp.

Conditions for the American POWs were very poor, according to an International Red Cross inspection of 25 March 1945. Around 200 men were crowded into each barrack. There was no hot water for washing, and the number of latrines was inadequate. Food rations were only about 1,070 calories a day, though additional supplies, mostly root vegetables, could be bought from the canteen when available. No Red Cross parcels were delivered, so the Serbs insisted on sharing theirs.

In late March 1945 General George S. Patton ordered the 4th Armored Division to liberate the POWs in Oflag XIII-B, then  behind the front lines. Unfortunately German resistance to the "Hammelburg Raid" was stronger than anticipated. Although Task Force Baum arrived at the camp on 27 March 1945 and attempted to liberate the U.S. POWs, the mission was a failure; of the roughly 300 men of the task force, 32 were killed in action and only 35 made it back to Allied territory, with the remainder being taken prisoner. All the 57 tanks, tank destroyers, trucks, and half-tracks were lost.

The American compound was evacuated on 28 March, when 500 POWs were transferred to the camp at Nuremberg by train. Those too sick to move were left behind with the medical staff.

The camp was captured by Combat Command B of the U.S. 14th Armored Division on 6 April 1945.

See also
 List of prisoner-of-war camps in Germany
 John K. Waters, George S. Patton's son-in-law and one of the men imprisoned at Oflag XIII-B

References

External links
 Stalag 13 Today
 Oflag 64 Association
 First hand account of Oflag XIII-B by Donald Prell
 Actual photographic footage of the liberation:  http://www.criticalpast.com/video/65675071587_prisoners-of-war_M-4-tank_American-soldiers_prisoners-wave
Oflags